Ann Johnson Stewart (born July 27, 1964) is a Democratic politician, university professor, activist, and civil engineer from Minnesota. She entered politics as a protester against guns and has since been heavily involved in Democratic politics.

Originally from Wisconsin, Johnson Stewart teaches at the University of Minnesota and also works on engineering projects.

Johnson Stewart is a member of the Minnesota Senate, representing District 44, which includes Plymouth, Minnetonka, and Woodland in Hennepin County in the Twin Cities metropolitan area.

Life, academic career, and engineering career 
Johnson Stewart received her Bachelor of Civil Engineering from the University of Wisconsin-Platteville and her Master's at the University of Minnesota Twin Cities. She is a civil engineer with a small business that works with local governments to build publicly funded roads, bridges, and buildings. Johnson Stewart has also taught at the University of Minnesota and local technical colleges for over 20 years.

Political involvement 
Johnson Stewart defeated Greg Pulles in 2020 after incumbent Senator Paul Anderson decided not to run again. She serves on the following committees:

 Capital Investment
 Transportation Finance and Policy

Her legislative priorities are transportation and infrastructure.

References 

1964 births
Living people
University of Wisconsin–Platteville alumni
Democratic Party Minnesota state senators